Geo Films is a film production and distribution company owned by Geo Television Network based in Karachi, Pakistan. Geo Films distributes Hollywood, Lollywood and Indian films in cinemas across Pakistan.

Films distributed

Foreign films
The following is the complete list of films distributed by Geo Films in Pakistan:

Pakistani films

See also
 List of film distributors in Pakistan

References

External links 
 

Mass media companies of Pakistan
Film distributors of Pakistan